Abraham Isaac Sofaer (1 October 1896 – 21 January 1988) was a Burmese-born British actor who began his career on stage and became a familiar supporting player in film and on television in his later years.

Life and career
Although Sofaer was born in Rangoon, Burma (then a part of the British Empire), he was descended from Baghdadi Jews. The son of a very successful merchant, Isaac Sofaer (who established the Sofaer Building, Rangoon, which still stands today), he was educated locally at the Diocesan Boys’ High School. His education continued in England, and he initially worked as a school teacher in Rangoon and later in London.  

Sofaer began his acting career on the London stage in 1921, but soon he was alternating between theatre productions in London and New York. He appeared in the 1933 musical He Wanted Adventure alongside Bobby Howes. In 1935, he gained widespread attention on Broadway portraying Prime Minister Benjamin Disraeli in Victoria Regina. 

During the 1930s he also began appearing in both British and American films. Among his more prominent performances were his dual role as the Judge and Surgeon in Powell and Pressburger's A Matter of Life and Death (1946) and as Saint Paul in Quo Vadis (1951).

He also appeared on television from its earliest days in the late 1930s and on radio, including a small part in Dorothy L. Sayers' The Man Born to Be King.  

Although his film appearances diminished after the 1950s, he continued to have guest roles on dozens of major U.S. television series throughout the 1960s.  He made three appearances on Perry Mason including as Sylvester Robey in the 1960 episode "The Case of the Crying Cherub" and his voice was  featured in two episodes of Star Trek. 

Other guest appearances were in Wagon Train, Gunsmoke,  The Twilight Zone, The Investigators, Daniel Boone, The Time Tunnel, Lost in Space, and The Outer Limits. He may be best remembered for his recurring role as Haji, the master of all genies, on I Dream of Jeannie and as The Swami who advises Peter Tork in the "Sauna" scene in The Monkees' 1968 film Head.

Personal life

In 1920, Sofaer married Angela Psyche Christian, with whom he had two sons and four daughters. He retired from acting in 1974.

The noted jurist Abraham David Sofaer is the actor's first cousin, once removed.

Death
Sofaer died at the Motion Picture & Television Country House and Hospital in Woodland Hills, Los Angeles, California, as the result of congestive heart failure in 1988, aged 91.

Complete filmography

 Dreyfus (1931) - Dubois
 The House Opposite (1932) - Fahmy
 Stamboul (1932) - Mahmed Pasha
 The Flying Squad (1932) - Li Yoseph
 Insult (1932) - Ali Ben Achmed
 The Flag Lieutenant (1933) - Meheti Salos
 Long Live the King (1933, Short) - Alexis
 Karma (1933) - Holy Man
 The Wandering Jew (1933) - Zapportas
 Trouble (1933) - Ali
 Little Miss Nobody (1933) - Mr. Beal
 High Finance (1933) - Myers
 Ask Beccles (1933) - Baki
 Oh No Doctor! (1934) - Skelton
 Nell Gwynn (1934) (uncredited)
 The Admiral's Secret (1934) - Don Pablo y Gonzales
 The Private Life of Don Juan (1934) - Street Bookseller (uncredited)
 Things to Come (1936) - Wadsky (uncredited)
 The House of the Spaniard (1936) - Vidal
 Rembrandt (1936) - Dr. Menasseh
 The Switchback (1939, TV Movie)
 Caesar's Friend (1939, TV Movie) - Annas
 The Deacon and the Jewess (1939, TV Movie) - Benedict the Pointer, Jew of Oxford
 The Great Adventure (1939, TV Movie) - Ebag
 Freedom Radio (1941) - Heini
 The Prime Minister (1941) - Turkish ambassador (uncredited)
 Crook's Tour (1941) - Ali
 The Queen of Spades (1946, TV Movie) - Tchekalinsky
 The Man with the Cloak Full of Holes (1946, TV Movie) - Luis Santangel
 A Matter of Life and Death (1946) - The Judge
 Caesar's Friend (1947, TV Movie) - Joseph Caiaphas
 The Merchant of Venice (1947, TV Movie, aired on two days) - Shylock
 Dual Alibi (1947) - French Judge
 Trilby (1947, TV Movie) - Svengali
 The Ghosts of Berkeley Square (1947) - Benjamin Disraeli
 Dim'at Ha'Nehamah Ha'Gedolah (1947) - Corporal / Commentator: Jordan's Tale
 Calling Paul Temple (1948) - Dr. Kohima
 Tilly of Bloomsbury (1948, TV Movie) - Mehta Ram
 Counsellor at Law (1949, TV Movie) - George Simon
 A Man's House (1949, TV Movie) - Salathiel
 The Gentle People (1949, TV Movie) - Jonah Goodman
 Christopher Columbus (1949) - Luis de Santangel
 The Squeaker (1949, TV Movie) - Lew Friedman
 Dick Whittington (1949, TV Movie) - Sultan
 Cairo Road (1950) - Commandant
 Pandora and the Flying Dutchman (1951) - Judge
 Quo Vadis (1951) - Paul, Christian Evangelist
 Judgment Deferred (1952) - Chancellor
 Music at Night (1952, TV Movie) - Nicholas Lengel
 His Majesty O'Keefe (1954) - Fatumak, Medicine Man
 The Naked Jungle (1954) - Incacha
 Elephant Walk (1954) - Appuhamy
 Out of the Clouds (1955) - The Indian
 Bhowani Junction (1956) - Surabhai
 The First Texan (1956) - Don Carlos
 Omar Khayyam (1957) - Tutush
 The Story of Mankind (1957) - Indian Chief
 The Sad Sack (1957) - Hassim
 Song Without End (1960) - Emissary in Rome (uncredited)
 Hitler (1962) - Morris Kaplan
 Taras Bulba (1962) - Abbot
 Captain Sindbad (1963) - Galgo
 Twice-Told Tales (1963) - Prof. Pietro Baglioni
 4 for Texas (1963) - Pulaski
 The Greatest Story Ever Told (1965) - Joseph of Arimathaea
 Journey to the Center of Time (1967) - Dr. 'Doc' Gordon
 Head (1968) - Swami
 Che! (1969) - Pablo Rojas
 Justine (1969) - Proprietor
 Chisum (1970) - Chief White Buffalo

Selected television appearances 
Perry Mason - “The Case of the Deadly Double” (1958) Dr. Maitland
 Zane Grey Theatre — "Mission" (1959) — Comanche Chief Alou 
 The Real McCoys — "The Rainmaker" (1959)  Arapaho Chief
 Wagon Train — "The Stagecoach Story" (1959)  Antonio DeVargo
 Gunsmoke — "Kitty's Killing" (1960–1962) — Jeremiah Leech / Harvey Easter
 The Twilight Zone — "The Mighty Casey" (1960) — Dr. Stillman
 Peter Gunn — "A Penny Saved" (1961) — Boris Petrov
 Thriller — "The Weird Tailor" (1961) — Nicolai
 Outer Limits — "Demon with a glass hand" (1964) — Arch
 Star Trek — "Charlie X" (1966) — The Thasian
 The Man from U.N.C.L.E. "The Brain-Killer Affair" (1965) — Mr. Gabhail Samoy, head of U.N.C.L.E. operations in Calcutta
 The Time Tunnel — "Revenge of the Gods" (1966) — Epeios
 I Dream of Jeannie — "The Birds and the Bees Bit" (1967) — Haji
 Lost in Space — "The Flaming Planet" (1968) — Sobram
 Kolchak: The Night Stalker "Horror in the Heights" (1974) — Rakshasa Hunter (final appearance)

References

External links 
 
 

1896 births
1988 deaths
20th-century Burmese male actors
Burmese emigrants to the United States
Burmese Jews
Burmese male film actors
Burmese male stage actors
Burmese people of Iraqi-Jewish descent
People from Yangon
British people of Iraqi-Jewish descent
British male film actors
British male stage actors
British expatriate male actors in the United States
20th-century British male actors
Burmese emigrants to the United Kingdom
Jewish British male actors
British people of Indian-Jewish descent
British male actors of Indian descent
Baghdadi Jews
English emigrants to the United States